Patrick Robin Archibald Boyle, 10th Earl of Glasgow,  (born 30 July 1939), is a Scottish peer, politician and the current chief of Clan Boyle. The family seat is Kelburn Castle in Ayrshire. He currently sits as a Liberal Democrat peer in the House of Lords.

Early life
He was born to the 9th Earl of Glasgow and his first wife Dorothea Lyle. He was educated at Ludgrove School and then Eton College, where he was elected a member of Pop. He attended the Sorbonne in Paris for his university studies.

Career
In 1960, he served in the Royal Naval Reserve, receiving the rank of sub-lieutenant. He subsequently worked as an assistant director in films and as a television documentary producer, he founded Kelburn Country Centre in 1977.

He succeeded to his father's titles in 1984, and became a deputy lieutenant of Ayrshire and Arran in 1995. He was elected in 2005 to succeed the 5th Earl Russell as one of the 92 hereditary peers to remain in the House of Lords after the House of Lords Act 1999.

Personal life
He married Isabel James, daughter of George Douglas James, on 30 November 1974.
They have two children: 
David Michael Douglas Boyle, Viscount Kelburn (born 15 October 1978)
Lady Alice Dorothy Boyle (born 10 June 1981)

References

External links

1939 births
Living people
People educated at Eton College
University of Paris alumni
Earls of Glasgow
Liberal Democrats (UK) hereditary peers
Scottish clan chiefs
Deputy Lieutenants of Ayrshire and Arran
Patrick
British expatriates in France
Royal Naval Reserve personnel
People educated at Ludgrove School
Glasgow
Glasgow